The OFSAA Cross Country Championships are the Ontario high school cross country championships, held annually in varying locations around Ontario, usually on the first Saturday of November. Approximately 1600 runners compete in six races, making it the largest OFSAA meet of any sport.

Due to the COVID-19 pandemic, OFSAA announced that all fall and winter championships would be cancelled meaning that the 2020 cross country championships was not held.

Participation 
Athletes may qualify to compete in the championships as a team or individually. Each of the nineteen Regional Associations under the OFSAA umbrella host their own qualifying event to select participants for the provincial championships. The top two teams and top five (as of 2022) individuals (excluding runners already qualifying as members of a team) in each age and gender classification from eighteen of the Regional Associations qualify for OFSAA. Each qualifying team may enter five runners into the competition. This qualification structure results in a maximum of 270 competitors in each event of the championships.

Event classification 

The OFSAA championships consist of six separate races, one for males and one for females in each of three age categories:

 Novice: individuals who were less than 14 years of age on the first day of January of the year in which the competition is held and who are enrolled in the ninth grade
 Junior: individuals who were less than 15 years of age on the first day of January of the year in which the competition is held
 Senior: individuals who were less than 19 years of age on the first day of January of the year in which the competition is held and whose first date of entry into the ninth grade occurred within five years of the date of the competition

Date and schedule 
All events of the championship are held on the first Saturday of November unless extraordinary circumstances dictate a change.
The order of events is normally:
 novice girls' race
para race co-ed
 novice boys' race
 junior girls' race
 junior boys' race
 senior girls' race
 senior boys' race
 awards ceremony

The course is open the day before competition for athletes and coaches to walk or run the course.  Once races have commenced, the course is closed to all persons excluding those competing in the specific race underway. Any persons infringing upon this rule may cause their school's entire team to be disqualified from competition.

Course location and specifications 
The championships are moved around the province on a regional rotation such that they take place in central Ontario (outside of metropolitan Toronto) one year, followed by one year in Toronto, one in eastern Ontario, one in northern Ontario, one in southern Ontario and one in western Ontario. The host Association and exact location for each championship are determined no later than at the OFSAA Annual Meeting held in April of the school year prior to the event.

As cross country is an off-road event, the competition is normally held on a golf course or in a conservation area or other park. Course terrain is uneven and may include steep hills.  Ground cover is commonly short grass or dirt but courses may also include sections of sand, gravel and other surfaces.

OFSAA regulations stipulate the following course lengths for each event (±400m):
 novice girls - 4000m
 para race co-ed - 3000m
 novice boys - 4000m
 junior girls - 5000m
 junior boys - 5000m
 senior girls - 6000m
 senior boys - 6000m

The course starting line must be 65–75 metres in width and include a separate starting box for competitors from each regional Association (and two boxes for TDSSAA competitors).  Each starting box must measure three metres wide and four metres deep.

Scoring and awards 
Team scores are determined by summing the finishing places of the top four runners on each team, with lower numeric scores indicating a higher placement for the team.  Ties are decided in favour of the team whose fourth runner finished first.

Medals are awarded to the top three teams and top three individuals in each event. Ribbons are awarded to individuals and teams who finish fourth through tenth.  A banner is awarded to the school represented by the first place team in each event.

As of 2014, medals are awarded to the top three teams and individuals in each event, with ribbons awarded for all other individuals and teams in the top 10.

Past champions

Individual

References 

  6. https://www.trackdatabase.com/viewmeet.php?current_meet=zzzz_db1283

External links 
 Official web site
 (http://www.runnerspace.com/eprofile.php?event_id=4865)

Sport in Ontario